

Eastern group

Teams
Szolnoki MÁV FC and MTK Budapest FC finished the 2010–11 season in the bottom two places of the table and thus were relegated to their respective NB II divisions. MTK ended a 16-year stay in the top league, while Szolnok were relegated after just one year in the league.

The two relegated teams were replaced with the champions of the two 2010–11 NB II groups, Diósgyőri VTK of the East Group and Pécsi MFC of the West Group. Diósgyőr made their immediate comeback to the league, while Pécs returned to the competition after an absence of four seasons.

Stadium and locations

League table

Western group

References

Nemzeti Bajnokság II seasons
2011–12 in Hungarian football
Hun